Jue may refer to:
 Jue (vessel), an ancient 3-legged Chinese wine pitcher
 Jue, a minor character in The Animatrix
 Japan University of Economics

People with the surname
 Bhawoh Jue, NFL Free Safety
 Dong Jue, court official and general of the Shu Han during the Three Kingdoms period
 Jason P Jue, academic

See also
Chueh (disambiguation)